Cambridge Technicals are vocational qualifications, offered by Oxford, Cambridge and RSA Examinations (OCR) in the United Kingdom, and Cambridge International Examinations (CIE) internationally; both are part of Cambridge University Press & Assessment. These qualifications are intended for secondary school students age 16 to 18 who want to study a practical, work-related curriculum. In the UK's Qualifications and Credit Framework (QCF) a Tech Level 2 qualification is equivalent to a GCSE, and a Level 3 is equivalent to an A Level. The qualifications are designed with the workplace in mind and provide a high quality alternative to A Levels, supporting progression to higher education.

Regulation 
All Tech Level qualifications must meet criteria set by the UK's Department for Education (DfE) for all 'Applied General' qualifications, including the endorsement of five employers registered at Companies House. Tech Level qualifications must have:

 at least 300 guided learning hours 
 mandatory content must make up at least 40%
 30% external assessment
 one opportunity to resit (retake)
 three grading points or more, such as Distinction/Merit/Pass

Change 
In 2014 the UK government announced it would reform all vocational qualifications. By 2021 it was ready to set out its plan for vocational qualifications in England.

During the COVID-19 pandemic, OCR announced a series of adjustments it would make to support learners taking Cambridge Technicals.

Subjects 
The following subjects are offered:
Applied Science
Art and Design
Business
Digtal media
Engineering
Health and Social Care
Information Technology
Media
Performing Arts
Sport and Physical Activity

External references 
OCR website

References

Vocational education in the United Kingdom
Cambridge International Examinations
Cambridge Assessment
Departments of the University of Cambridge